In mathematics, Mazur's lemma is a result in the theory of normed vector spaces. It shows that any weakly convergent sequence in a normed space has a sequence of convex combinations of its members that converges strongly to the same limit, and is used in the proof of Tonelli's theorem.

Statement of the lemma

That is, for every continuous linear functional  the continuous dual space of 

Then there exists a function  and a sequence of sets of real numbers

such that  and

such that the sequence defined by the convex combination

See also

References

 

 

Banach spaces
Theorems involving convexity
Theorems in functional analysis
Lemmas in analysis
Compactness theorems